Kuyili (died 1780) was an army commander of queen Velu Nachiyar who participated in campaigns against the East India Company in the 18th century. She is considered the first suicide bomber and "first woman martyr" in Indian history.            
                                                                    

kuyili was born in the 18th century at Kudanchavadi, near [[Sivaganga district|Sivagangai district]]. Her mother was also known for her bravery and is said to have died while fighting with a wild bull to save her fields from being destroyed. Kuyili was a devout commander of Velu Nachiyar and repeatedly saved her life. On one such occasion, when she discovered that her ''[[Silambam]]'' teacher was actually a spy, she took action to save the queen immediately. On another occasion, when the queen was attacked during her sleep, she attacked the enemy and injured herself in the process. Seeing her loyalty and bravery, she was made the commander-in-chief of the women's wing of her army. Kuyili later played an important role in the [[Sivaganga Palace|Sivaganga]] expedition of the queen.<ref>{{Cite web|last=Udayavani|title=Kuyili- A brave commander who was the First ever suicide bomber in indian history. She is belong to schedule caste of Arunthathiyar community. The Arunthathiyar are called him as Veerathai Or veeramangai . The tamil nadu government decided to built a memorial statue for this contribution on freedom moments.

Death 
Kuyili is known for her suicide attack in 1780. While attacking a fort of East India Company, she applied ghee on her body, set herself ablaze and jumped into the armoury of the East India Company, securing victory for Velu Nachiyar.

Legacy 
The Tamil Nadu government erected a memorial to Kuyili in the Sivagangai district.

See also
 Rani Velu Nachiar
 Suicide attack

References 

Fictional Indian people
Fictional suicide attacks